A Case for the Court was a weekly CBC Television show that ran from July 1960 to September 1962.

The show was produced in cooperation with the Canadian Bar Association, involving the enactment of fictional criminal and civil cases using actual judges and lawyers.

References

External links
 
A Case for the Court - Canadian Communication Foundation

1960 Canadian television series debuts
1962 Canadian television series endings
CBC Television original programming